William Clark Jarnagin (May 24, 1914 – October 19, 1979) was an American football and basketball coach. He served as the interim head football coach at Hardin–Simmons University during the 1943 Sun Bowl. Jarnigan was the head football coach at West Texas State University—now known as West Texas A&M University—from 1958 to 1959. He was also the head basketball coach at Hardin–Simmons during the 1942–43 season.

Head coaching record

College football

Notes

References

1914 births
1979 deaths
American football centers
Baylor Bears football coaches
Hardin–Simmons Cowboys basketball coaches
Hardin–Simmons Cowboys football coaches
Hardin–Simmons Cowboys football players
North Carolina Pre-Flight Cloudbusters football coaches
West Texas A&M Buffaloes football coaches
High school football coaches in Texas
People from Graham, Texas
Players of American football from Texas